Curtis Allen Schmidt (born March 16, 1970) played one year of Major League Baseball in  for the Montreal Expos. During his 11 games, he pitched 10.1 innings, allowing 15 hits and eight runs.

External links
, or Retrosheet, or The Baseball Gauge, or  Venezuela Winter League

1970 births
Living people
American expatriate baseball players in Canada
Baseball players from Montana
Calgary Cannons players
Gulf Coast Expos players
Harrisburg Senators players
Howard Hawks baseball players
Jamestown Expos players
Kansas Jayhawks baseball players
Leones del Caracas players
American expatriate baseball players in Venezuela
Major League Baseball pitchers
Montreal Expos players
Ottawa Lynx players
People from Miles City, Montana
Somerset Patriots players
West Palm Beach Expos players